Hepatitis Testing Day is May 19 in the United States.

References

Health awareness days
Hepatitis
May observances
Observances in the United States